Tiquilia plicata, the fanleaf crinklemat or fan-leaved tiquilia, is a perennial, subshrub-like plant of lower elevation deserts in the family Boraginaceae, the borages and forget-me-nots. It is found in the southwestern United States and northwestern Mexico, in the states of California, Nevada, Arizona, Sonora, and Baja California. It is a short, low-growing plant, seldom over 12 in tall.

It has purple, lavender to bluish 5-lobed flowers; also small ovate leaves, crinkly with ridges, up to 1/2 in.

See also
Calflora Database: Tiquilia plicata (fanleaf crinklemat,  plicate coldenia)
 UC CalPhotos gallery —  Tiquilia plicata 
Northern Arizona Flora.org: Boraginaceae (broken link)

References

plicata
Flora of Arizona
Flora of the California desert regions
Flora of Nevada
Flora of Sonora
Flora of the Sonoran Deserts
Natural history of the Colorado Desert
Natural history of the Mojave Desert
North American desert flora
Least concern plants